The qualification event for the 2011 World Wheelchair Curling Championship took place from November 7 to 12, 2010 at the Kisakallio Sports Institute in Lohja, Finland. The event's two top finishers (China and Russia) both qualify to participate in the 2011 World Wheelchair Curling Championship.

The two qualification spots are determined as follows: At the conclusion of the round-robin, the top four teams advance to the playoffs. The playoffs follow the first and second rounds of the page playoff system. In the first round, the first seed plays the second and the third seed playing the fourth. In the final round, the loser of 1 v. 2 plays the winner of 3 vs. 4 in the Second Place Game, like in the semifinal of the page playoff system. However, unlike the page playoff system, the winner of 1 vs. 2. The winner of 1 vs. 2 qualifies to the worlds, while the winner of the second place game also qualifies to the worlds.

Teams

Round-robin standings

Round-robin results

Draw 1

Draw 2

Draw 3

Draw 4

Draw 5

Draw 6

Draw 7

Draw 8

Draw 9

Playoffs

1 vs. 2

 is qualified to participate in the worlds
 moves to Second Place Game

3 vs. 4

 advances to Second Place Game

Second Place Game
Loser of 1 vs. 2 plays against Winner of 3 vs. 4 for the second qualification spot.

 qualifies to participate in the worlds

External links

World Wheelchair Curling Championship
2010 in curling
2010 in Finnish sport
Qualification for curling competitions
International curling competitions hosted by Finland